Huáng Yǒng Pīng (February 18, 1954 – October 20, 2019) was a Chinese-French contemporary artist and one of the most well known Chinese avant-garde artists of his time. Born in Xiamen, he was recognized as the most controversial and provocative artist of the Chinese art scene of the 1980s.

Huang was one of the earliest contemporary Chinese artists to consider art as strategy. As a self-taught student, some of his earliest artistic inspirations came from Joseph Beuys, John Cage, and Marcel Duchamp. He later graduated from art school in Hangzhou in 1982, and formed Xiamen Dada (廈門達達) in 1986. Huang's oeuvre can be characterized by four periods: anti-artistic affectation (fan jiaoshi zhuyi), anti-self-expression (fan ziwo biaoxian he xingshi zhuyi), anti-art (fan yishu), and anti-history (fanyishushi). At the age of 35 in 1989, Huang traveled to Paris to partake in the seminal exhibition Magiciens de la terre. He later immigrated to France and lived there ever since. As many of his pieces are very large, they are not suitable for auction.

In 1999, Huang represented France in the Venice Biennale. In 2016, his piece "Empires" was selected for the Monumenta biennial exposition at the Grand Palais in Paris. 

Xiamen Dada was a group formed by Huang Yong Ping with Zha Lixiong, Liu Yiling, Lin Chun and Jiao Yaoming in 1986, as a postmodernist, radical avant-garde group. However, their works were often perceived as modern. The group publicly burned their works in protest, and Huang stated, “Artwork to artist is like opium to men. Until art is destroyed, life is never peaceful.” The group later withheld from any other public showings.

Huang was represented by Gladstone Gallery in New York, Kamel Mennour in Paris, and Tang Contemporary in Beijing. He died of illness in Paris at the age of 65 on 20th October, 2019.

Religion and its role
Huang incorporated many different Chinese philosophies into his works, like Chan Buddhism, Taoism, some western philosophies and Dada, which led to the formation of the Xiamen Dada group. There are many similarities between Chan Buddhism and Dada as the common phrase suggests, “Chan is Dada, Dada is Chan." Both Chan and Dada are direct and reflective about aesthetic importance and the impossible reality of reality. However, Chan Buddhism and Taoism are constantly changing, and since Dada is Chan and vice versa, this should be the case for Dada. However, they are opposed to adding more movements making it a paradox and essential having this idea work against Dada's main ideas. The use of these philosophies are an example of “cross-cultural exchange” and manifest in many of his works such as “A Concise History of Modern Art” after Two Minutes in the Washing Machine and A “Book Washing” Project.

Early artworks

Roulette-Series
Roulette-Series is a three series project from 1985–1988 including portable roulettes consisting of six turntables. In this piece, Huang focused on chance, divination, and a non-subjective way of creating his art works. His finished abstract works were determined either by dice, a roulette wheel and other apparatuses that help create his pieces by chance or accident. This process determined anything from the color to the juxtaposition of each element. His theory is that one cannot escape destiny, and that destiny itself is not separate from accident or chance. Huang's artworks tend to diverge from their original ideas, as "his method always involve a deferring process," and this series is very much so a product of those ideas. As a stage in his anti-self-expression phase, Huang let external forces influence his artwork and determine the final product based on the outcomes of inanimate objects, such as the roulette wheel or dice.
Marcel Duchamp was a big influence on these pieces, as Huang not only eliminated the aesthetic taste and added spontaneity, but also created the portable roulettes as did Duchamp. He also looked Wittgenstein's theory on ontology and representation. Huang categorized it in three ways, as a process of art saying "work of art is bigger than the thought", conceptual art saying "the thought is bigger than the work of art" which is contradicting the first statement and then the last way to categorize it is the "Eastern Spirit" the Taoist and Chan Buddhist concept. The way Huang went about creating his paintings were done in a specific order. The canvas he was working on was divided into eight sections, which corresponded to a turntable that also had eight sections. He determined what materials to use by rolling a dice, and the juxtaposition of the pieces were determined by the tables.

Huang said, 
“every rule indicates an anti-rule, every motive indicates a kind of anti-motive, every choice indicates a kind of anti-choice. He therefore believes: ‘However much art there is so much anti-art exists’ ”.

A Concise History of Modern Art after Two Minutes in the Washing Machine 
A Concise History of Modern Art after Two Minutes in the Washing Machine is a simple project with a complex idea. It takes two famous textbooks on  Chinese art, one by the Chinese art historian Wang Bomin and the other by the English art historian Herbert Read, and puts them in a washing machine for two minutes. The finish product is a pile of pulp displayed on a wooden box.

Huang sought to essentially erase the clash between tradition and modernity, historically represented by the East and West respectively. The pulp represents breaking the division between these to contradictory themes of traditional and modern art. Making History states, according to Huang, “this was his response to an enigmatic question that had preoccupied generations of modern Chinese intellectuals and artists: how to position oneself between tradition and modernity and between East and West?” "A Concise History of Modern Art" after Two Minutes in the Washing Machine has a simple premise but a complex idea.
It is much like A "Book Washing" Project, a performance piece done in the artist's home in Xiamen, which came three years earlier than A Concise History of Modern Art. Often described as having a “radical anti-art history,” these works are a part of two of his early anti-art and anti-history periods. In A "Book Washing" Project, he took all the books from his bookshelf and put them in the wash to create a pulp like he did in A Concise History of Modern Art but on a larger scale. He took the pulp created by the washing process he then stuck it back on the wall. The two pieces share the same premise and concept, but the specific materials (i.e. which books) he used in producing the pieces were different.

After leaving China  

After Tiananmen Square massacre occurred while Huang was in Paris for the Magicians of Earth (1989) exhibition, and he decided not to return to China. His works subsequently changed dramatically and focused prominently on Taoist and Buddhist philosophies. He suddenly was immersed in western ways.

House of Oracles
The House of Oracles Retrospective on Huang's work was shown at the Walker Art Center, from October 16, 2005 through January 15, 2006, at the Massachusetts Museum of Contemporary Art from March 18, 2006 to February 25, 2007, at the Vancouver Art Gallery from April 5 to September 16, 2007, and Ullens Center for Contemporary Art in Beijing from March 22 to June 8, 2008. The program to this retrospective describes Huang's work as:Huang's sculptures and installations—drawing on the legacies of Joseph Beuys, Arte Povera, and John Cage as well as traditional Chinese art and philosophy—routinely juxtapose traditional objects or iconic images with modern references.

The House of Oracles features more than forty of Huang Yong Ping's works starting from his first exhibition Magicians of Earth (1989) up until this shows, showing the most significant ones of the past two decades. These works include: Bat Project II (2002), The Nightmare of King George V (2002), Python (2000) and many more.

Renowned Curator, Fei Dawei says: "This first retrospective of Huang Yongping originated at the Walker Art Centre in the United States. It was shown at Mass Moca, the biggest contemporary museum in America and then Vancouver Art Gallery, Canada, before traveling to its final venue, UCCA in Beijing. And even before the inauguration of UCCA, I've decided to put on this exhibition because as a Chinese Museum, we feel obliged to introduce the best Chinese artists. This is of great importance for the artist, as well as for the audiences in contemporary art and especially, for UCCA's image, as an institution in the art world." 

His art pieces show portray historical events and the influences of political powers.The Nightmare of King George V portrays a 1911 hunting excursion that King George V went on to poach game in the juggle. Bat Project II historical background was Huang Yong Ping was going to recreate an exact replica of the U.S spy plane that crashed into a Chinese fighter, leading to controversy with in politics.

100 Arms of Guan-yin

In 1996, Huang participated in Manifesta, the European Biennial of Contemporary Art in Rotterdam, and in 1997, the "Skulptur.Projekte" in Münster, Germany with his sculpture "100 Arms of Guan-yin". The Guanyin figure is associated with Buddhism and has multiple arms. Huang Yong Ping interprets this famous deity through his own 100 Arms of Guan-in by placing mannequin arms holding various objects on a metal structure which is itself an enlarged version of Marcel Duchamp's 1914 readymade Bottle Rack.

During 2008, Huang's work was on display at the Astrup Fearnley museum of modern art in Oslo, Norway.
This is his first solo show in Norway.

For his first UK solo show in The Curve, Barbican Art Gallery, London, Huang Yong Ping created a new installation that explores the imperial history between Britain and China in the 19th century, focusing on the Opium Wars. The exhibition takes its title Frolic from the name of a ship built to transport goods between British India, China and Great Britain. The exhibition was on from 25 June-21 September 2008.

Serpent d'océan

In 2012, Huang's serpent d'océan, a monumental sculpture depicting the skeleton of a giant sea serpent, was installed in Saint-Brevin-les-Pins.

Controversy 
Bat Project II (2002) was planned as a massive 20 x 15 x 6 m steel outdoor installation at the opening of China's First Guangzhou Triennial at the Guangdong Museum of Art. Two days before the show opening, on November 16, 2002, foreign ministry officials removed the work, then partially completed. The work, which was recreated in part in Huang's House of Oracles retrospective, was a full-scale model of the cockpit section and left wing of an American EP-3 spy plane, filled with taxodermically preserved bats. The plane modeled the one that collided with a Chinese fighter jet in March 2001, killing the Chinese pilot.

The 2008 exhibition of his piece, Theatre of the World, at the Vancouver Art Gallery met with Animal Rights protests and legal threats due to its reliance on the violent interaction between insects in an enclosed space. The work was part of House of Oracles, his travelling retrospective exhibition.

Exhibitions

Selected solo shows
2016
"Monumenta," Grand Palais, Paris; 
"Wolfgang Hahn Prize,” Museum Ludwig, Cologne, Germany; 
“Bâton Serpent III: Spur Track to the Left,” Power Station of Art, Shanghai.

2015
“Huang Yong Ping: Bâton Serpent II,” Red Brick Art Museum, Beijing

2014
“Les Mues,” HAB Galerie – Hangar à Bananes, Nantes, France; 
“Huang Yong Ping: Bâton Serpent,” Maxxi, Rome.

2013
“Amoy/Xiamen,” Museum of Contemporary Art, Lyon, France; 
“Abbottabad,” Hôtel de Gallifet, Aix-en-Provence, France.

2012
“Circus,” Gladstone Gallery, New York; 
“Bugarach,” Galerie Kamel Mennour, Paris; 
“Lille 3000, Fantastic,” Musée de l’Hospice Comtesse, Lille, France.

2011
“Huang Yong Ping,” Nottingham Contemporary, Nottingham, England.

2010
“Huang Yong Ping,” Musée Océanographique de Monaco, Monte Carlo, Monaco.

2009
"Huang Yong Ping: Arche 2009,” Ecole Nationale Supérieure des Beaux-Arts, Paris; 
“Huang Yong Ping: Tower Snake,” Gladstone Gallery, New York; 
“Huang Yong Ping: Caverne,” Kamel Mennour, Paris.

2008
House of Oracles: A Huang Yong Ping Retrospective, UCCA in Beijing

2007
“Huang Yong Ping,” Bernier and Eliades, Athens; 
“Huang Yong Ping: From C to P,” Gladstone Gallery, New York.

2006
“Pantheon,” Centre International d'art et du Paysage de l'ile de Vassiviere, l’ile de Vassiviere, France; 
“Les Mains de Bouddha,” Galerie Anne de Villepoix, Paris.

2005
House of Oracles, Walker Art Center, Minneapolis, U.S.A

2003
“Huang Yong Ping,” Massachusetts Museum of Contemporary Art, North Adams, Massachusetts; 
“Huang Yong Ping,” Beacon Project Space, Beacon, New York; 
“Huang Yong Ping,” Fundacion NMAC, Cadiz, Spain; 
“Huang Yong Ping,” Groningen, The Netherlands; 
“Huang Yong Ping,” Musée Dominique Vivant Denon, Chalon-sur-Saône, France.

2002
Xian Wu, Art & Public, Geneva, Switzerland 
"Om Mani Padme Hum," Barbara Gladstone Gallery, New York, U.S.A.

2000
"Taigong fishing, Willing to Bite the Bait," Jack Tilton Gallery, New York, U.S.A.

Bibliography
  Memorandum: Bat Project I, II, III, 2001-2004. Köln: Buchhandlung Walther König and Museum Ludwig, 2016.
  Wu Zei Huang Yong Ping , Jérôme Alexandre, Marie-Claude Beaud, Marie-Laure Bernadac, Robert Calcagno, Fei Dawei, Jean de Loisy, Huang Yong Ping, Arnaud Laporte, Richard Leydier, Jean-Hubert Martin, Jessica Morgan, Gilles A. Tiberghien, kamel mennour & Nouveau Musée National de Monaco, 2011.
  Myths Huang Yong Ping , Jean de Loisy, Gilles A. Tiberghien, Richard Leydier, kamel mennour, 2009.
  House of Oracles: a Huang Yong Ping Retrospective , Doryun Chong, Hou Hanru, Huang Yong Ping and Philippe Vergne, Walker Art Center, 2005.
  Magiciens de la terre, Jean-Hubert Martin, Centre Georges Pompidou, 1989.

Decorations 
 Officer of the Order of Arts and Letters (2015)

References

External links 
 kamel mennour – Huang Yong Ping
 Monumenta 2016 - HuangYong Ping

Chinese contemporary artists
1954 births
2019 deaths
French contemporary artists
Chinese emigrants to France
People who lost Chinese citizenship
Naturalized citizens of France
People from Xiamen
Artists from Fujian
Officiers of the Ordre des Arts et des Lettres